Laura Boulton (January 4, 1899 – October 16, 1980) was an American ethnomusicologist.  She is known for the many field recordings, films and photographs of traditional music and its performances and practitioners from Egypt, the Sudan, Uganda, Kenya and Tanganyika. Boulton also collected traditional musical instruments around the world. In her work with the National Film Board of Canada (NFB) during the Second World War, she is recognized as being a pioneer for women who work in the film industry.

Early life
Laura Theresa Crayton was born in Conneaut, Ohio on January 4, 1899. She studied voice at Western Reserve University and obtained a B.A. degree from Denison University. In 1925, she married Wolfrid Rudyard Boulton, Jr., who was an ornithologist and lecturer at the Carnegie Museums of Pittsburgh in Pittsburgh, Pennsylvania, on the ornithological staff of which she served in the early 1920s.

Expeditions
In 1929 Boulton began graduate studies at the University of Chicago's anthropology department. In January 1929, Boulton began the first of a series of research expeditions which she was to accompany or lead over the next 50 years, and brought with her a cylinder recorder in order to record folk music as well as bird calls. This trip to Africa under the auspices of the American Museum of Natural History, which lasted approximately three months, allowed Boulton to collect musical instruments and recordings from the indigenous populations of Egypt, The Sudan, Uganda, Kenya and Tanganyika.

Over the next 50 years, Boulton participated in dozens of international expeditions, compiling extensive collections of field recordings, films, photographs, and musical instruments. Her autobiography, titled The Music Hunter documents these travels, but offers little additional information. As stated in The Music Hunter, Boulton's mission was, “To capture, absorb, and bring back the world‘s music; not the music of the concert hall or the opera house, but the music of the people ...”

Boulton visited and collected musical data and instruments from (in addition to the aforementioned localities) Mozambique, Nyasaland, Rhodesia, Transvaal, Cape Province, Sierra Leone, Liberia, Angola, Nigeria, Senegal, the Colony of Niger, Dahomey and other parts of French Equatorial Africa, the British Cameroons, the Belgian Congo, Ethiopia and Ghana.

Boulton was to publish many articles and films, and helped to produce a multitude of museum exhibits related to the artifacts and data she gathered during her research. She also presented a large number of illustrated educational lectures for students of music and anthropology at the University of Chicago's anthropology department.

Filmmaking
In 1941, John Grierson, the head of the National Film Board of Canada contracted Boulton as a "freelancer" to make a series of films on Canadian cultural communities. Fellow women filmmakers also at the NFB like Judith Crawley was also hired on the same basis, while Evelyn Spice Cherry, Jane Smart and Gudrun Bjerring Parker were hired as permanent employees.

Although Boulton was originally only contracted for six weeks to make one film, her work at the NFB turned into a series called Peoples of Canada, consisting of 15 films. The goal of the wartime series was as a morale booster, that would "... broaden awareness of Canada’s cultural mosaic, in order to create a feeling of national unity." Although Boulton had little film experience, she collaborated with a number of experienced cinematographers, including Judith Crawley.

Robert Flaherty, the American filmmaker, and director of Nanook of the North (1922), served as a consultant on Boulton's three Baffin Island films. Postwar, Boulton's films would meet with great acclaim in Canada, the United States and Europe, contributing significantly to the growth of the NFB's international reputation.

Filmography
 Ukrainian Winter Holidays (Un Noël ukrainien) - documentary short, 1942 - musical director, director
 Eskimo Arts and Crafts (L'artisanat esquimau) - documentary short, 1943 - producer, director
 New Scotland - documentary short, 1943 - producer, director
 Ukrainian Dance (Danse ukrainienne) - documentary short, 1943 - producer, director
 Arctic Hunters (La chasse aux phoques) - documentary short, 1944 - producer, director
 Eskimo Summer (L'été chez les Esquimaux) - documentary short, 1944 - producer, director
 Habitant Arts and Crafts - documentary short, 1944 - producer, director
 Land of Quebec (Le Pays de Québec) - documentary short, 1944 - producer, director
 People of the Potlatch (Les Indiens de la côte ouest) - documentary short, 1944 - producer, director
 Poland on the Prairies - documentary short, 1944 - producer, director
 Polish Dance - documentary short, 1944 - producer, director
 Totems - documentary short, 1944 - producer, director
 Arctic Jungle (Carnet de voyage)- documentary short, Sydney Newman 1948 - co-cinematographer with Grant McLean
 Across Wartime Canada (silent lecture film) 
 Canadians All (silent Lecture film) 
 Canadian Design (silent lecture film)

Legacy
Today Boulton's large collections of traditional music materials are found at several institutions.  The Columbia University Center for Ethnomusicology has the Laura Boulton Collection of Traditional Music, with approximately 30,000 field recordings and accompanying documentation, purchased for Columbia in 1964. Boulton served as curator of this collection from 1962 to 1972. Boulton's liturgical music collection is found today at the Harvard University Archive of World Music, part of the Eda Kuhn Loeb Music Library. The Music Library has digitized this collection and made it available on the World Wide Web.
 
The Archive of Folk Culture at the Library of Congress contains wax cylinders, aluminum discs and reel-to-reel tapes of Boulton's field recordings of traditional vocal and instrumental music worldwide, with accompanying catalogs and commentaries.  The Smithsonian Institution Film Archives contains the originals of her film footage from 1934–1979, including collaborative films with the National Film Board of Canada. Smithsonian Folkways has the originals of recordings Boulton made for Folkways Records.

From 1972–77, Boulton took her personal collection with her to teach at Arizona State University.  This collection, later named “The Laura Boulton Collection of World Music and Musical Instruments” came to Indiana University, Bloomington in 1986 from Arizona State and the Laura Boulton Foundation.  The musical instruments are housed at the Mathers Museum of World Cultures, while the remaining materials are at the Archives of Traditional Music.

In 1977, Boulton started the Laura Boulton Foundation in New York City, a non-profit institution dedicated to supporting ethnomusicological research. Through the Foundation, Indiana University awards junior and senior Laura Boulton fellowships, designed for researchers to work with these materials.

References

Notes

Citations

Bibliography

 Boulton, Laura. The Music Hunter: The Autobiography of a Career. Garden City, New York: Doubleday. 1969.
 Druick, Zoë. Projecting Canada: Government Policy and Documentary Film at the National Film Board.  Montreal: McGill-Queens University Press, 2007. .
 Harris, Craig. Heartbeat, Warble, and the Electric Powwow: American Indian Music. Norman, Oklahoma: University of Oklahoma Press, 2016. .
 Khouri, Malek. Filming Politics: Communism and the Portrayal of the Working Class at the National Film Board of Canada, 1939-46. Calgary, Alberta, Canada: University of Calgary Press, 2007. .
 McMillan, Robert. "Ethnology and the N.F.B.: The Laura Boulton Mysteries." Canadian Journal of Film Studies / Revue canadienne d'études cinématographiques 1, no. 2, Spring 1991.
 Patterson, Karin Gaynell. Expressions of Africa in Los Angeles Public Performance, 1781--1994. Los Angeles: ProQuest, 2007. .
 Peek, Philip M. and Kwesi Yankah, eds. African Folklore: An Encyclopedia. London: Routledge, 2003. .

External links
 Laura Boulton biography
 Laura Boulton Collection at Indiana University, Bloomington
Boulton, Laura, 1899–1980. Collection of Byzantine and Orthodox Musics Finding Aid, Harvard University.
 About The Center for Ethnomusicology at Columbia University
 PDF: Ethnology and the N.F.B.: The Laura Boulton Mysteries
 
 Laura Boulton at femfilm.ca, Canadian Women Film Directors

1899 births
1980 deaths
Denison University alumni
American ethnomusicologists
People from Conneaut, Ohio
Film directors from Ohio
20th-century American musicologists
American women anthropologists
Early Recording Engineers (1930-1959)
Women audio engineers
American women documentary filmmakers
American documentary film directors
Anthropology documentary films
Ethnography of Canada
20th-century American women scientists